Aestuariivirga litoralis is a species of Alphaproteobacteria.

References

Hyphomicrobiales